Shively Field  is a public airport a mile southwest of Saratoga, in Carbon County, Wyoming.

Facilities
In the year ending May 30, 2020 the airport had 8,210 aircraft operations, average 22 per day: 88% general aviation and 12% air taxi.

References

External links 

Airports in Wyoming
Buildings and structures in Carbon County, Wyoming
Transportation in Carbon County, Wyoming